Hsieh Su-wei was the defending champion, but opted to play at the London Summer Olympics instead.

Wang Qiang won the title defeating Chan Yung-jan in the final 6–2, 6–4.

Seeds

Draw

Finals

Top half

Bottom half

References 
Main Draw
Qualifying Draw

Beijing International Challenger - Women's Singles
2012 Women's Singles